Nerea Agüero García (born 14 October 1997), known as Nerea Agüero, is a Spanish-born Argentine footballer who plays as a right back for Segunda División Pro club Granada CF and the Argentina women's national team.

Early life
Agüero was born in Navalmoral de la Mata to an Argentine father and a Spanish mother.

Club career 
Agüero has played for Sporting de Huelva, Sevilla FC, Torrelodones CF, Deportivo Alavés, Zaragoza CFF and Granada in Spain.

On the last day of July 2019, Granada CF announced the signing of Nerea Agüero. He once again dressed in shorts with the aim of going up to the First Division, and again he would be left with honey on his lips. From the beginning she owned the right lane, she played nineteen games out of twenty-two until the competition was paralyzed due to COVID-19. They finished second in the league, just one point behind Santa Teresa CD, with eight games still to play. 

On August 4, 2020, Nerea would renew with the Nasrid team. On the 26th of that month, he lost by two goals to one, the Andalusian Cup final against Real Betis.

International career
Agüero made her senior debut for Argentina on 30 November 2021.

References

External links 
Nerea Agüero at BDFutbol

1997 births
Living people
Citizens of Argentina through descent
Argentine women's footballers
Women's association football fullbacks
Argentina women's international footballers
Argentine people of Spanish descent
Sportspeople from the Province of Cáceres
Footballers from Extremadura
Spanish women's footballers
Sporting de Huelva players
Sevilla FC (women) players
Deportivo Alavés Gloriosas players
Zaragoza CFF players
Granada CF (women) players
Primera División (women) players
Segunda Federación (women) players
Spanish people of Argentine descent